Townsbury is an unincorporated community located within Liberty Township in Warren County, New Jersey, United States.

The Pequest River flows through the settlement.

History
The settlement was first called "Meng's Mill", named for John Meng, an early settler who established a grist mill here.  In the 1780s, the mill was owned by Benjamin Town and John Town, the settlement's namesake.

By 1882, Townsbury had a post office, grist mill, lumber mill, and a "good local trade".  The population was 102.

A line of the Lehigh and Hudson River Railway passed through Townsbury.  The abandoned railbed now forms the Pequest Wildlife Management Area Trail, a recreational rail trail between Townsbury and Buttzville.

References

Liberty Township, New Jersey
Unincorporated communities in Warren County, New Jersey
Unincorporated communities in New Jersey